Lara Briden (née Grinevitch, born 1969) is a naturopathic doctor, women’s health speaker, and author of the books Period Repair Manual and Hormone Repair Manual, published by Pan Macmillan. She has consulting rooms in Christchurch, New Zealand, and travels widely to speak on women’s health.

Early life 
Lara Grinevitch was born in 1969 in Edmonton, Alberta.

Education and career 
Briden is a 1993 graduate of the University of Calgary and 1997 graduate of the Canadian College of Naturopathic Medicine. She has a Bachelor of Science degree in evolutionary biology and worked as an evolutionary biology researcher at the University of Calgary from 1990-1993. From 1993-1997 she studied at CCNM, to become a Doctor of Naturopathic Medicine.

From 1997 to 2002, Briden worked in private practice in rural Alberta. In 2002 she moved to Sydney, Australia where she established a practice focusing on women’s health issues.

In 2015 she moved to Christchurch, New Zealand, but continued to travel regularly to Sydney to provide ongoing care for her Australian patients.

Briden is a regular speaker on women’s health issues,
writes for a variety of publications
and health-related websites,
and is a regular guest on health-related podcasts.

Publications

Period Repair Manual 
In February 2015, Briden published her first book, Period Repair Manual. The second edition was picked up by Pan Macmillan for the Australia/New Zealand market in 2018.

Additional language translations 

 German translation: “Die Perioden-Werkstatt”, published in 2018. 
 Spanish translation: “Cómo mejorar tu ciclo menstrual”, published in 2019.
 Estonian translation: “Paremate päevade käsiraamat”, published in 2019.
 Russian translation: "Менструация: руководство по эксплуатации", published in 2020.
 Dutch translation: “Grip op je cyclus”, published in 2021.
 Czech translation: "Jak si zlepšit menstruační cyklus", published in 2021.
 Brazilian Portuguese translation: "O Que Nunca Te Contaram Sobre Seu Ciclo Menstrual", published in 2021.
 Further language translations are under way.

Hormone Repair Manual 
Briden's second book, Hormone Repair Manual, on the topic of perimenopause and menopause, was published by Pan Macmillan in February 2021.

Additional language translations 

 Spanish translation: “Cómo mejorar tu salud hormonal”, published in 2021.
 Dutch translation: “Grip op de overgang”, published in 2021.

Peer-reviewed papers 
 “The central role of ovulatory disturbances in the etiology of androgenic polycystic ovary syndrome (PCOS)—Evidence for treatment with cyclic progesterone”, December 2020, Drug Discovery Today: Disease Models.
 “Beyond the Label: A Patient-Centred Approach to Polycystic Ovary Syndrome”, Vol. 29 No. 2 (2022), CAND Journal.

Scientific advisor 

 Member of the scientific advisory council for the Centre for Menstrual Cycle and Ovulation Research (CeMCOR) at the University of British Columbia.
 Member of the medical advisory board of Talk Peach Gynaecological Cancer Foundation.
 Member of the Endometriosis Special Interest Group (ESIG) of Endometriosis New Zealand.
 Editorial board CAND Journal, the official journal of the Canadian Association of Naturopathic Doctors.

References

External links 

 
 Amazon author page
 GoodReads author page

Living people
1969 births
Naturopaths